Thomas Windsor (by 1517 – c. 1567), of Bentley, Hampshire and London, was an English politician.

He was a Member (MP) of the Parliament of England for Reigate in 1555.

References

1560s deaths
English MPs 1555
People from Bentley, Hampshire
Politicians from London
Year of birth uncertain
People from Reigate